Sebastiano Poma (born June 13, 1993) is an Italian professional baseball outfielder for Parma Baseball of the Italian Serie A. 

Poma played for the  Italy national baseball team at the 2017 World Baseball Classic and the 2019 European Baseball Championship. He played for the team at the Africa/Europe 2020 Olympic Qualification tournament, in Italy in September 2019.

References

External links

1993 births
2016 European Baseball Championship players
2017 World Baseball Classic players
2019 European Baseball Championship players
Baseball outfielders
Italian baseball players
Living people
Parma Baseball Club players
T & A San Marino players
American expatriate baseball players in San Marino